The men's 5000 metres event at the 2007 Summer Universiade was held on 12 August.

Results

References
Results

5000
2007